River Ranch is a rural locality in the Gladstone Region, Queensland, Australia. In the  River Ranch had a population of 357 people.

Geography
The Calliope River forms part of the western boundary before flowing through to form part of the eastern.

Road infrastructure
The Bruce Highway passes through the north of the locality.

History
In the  River Ranch had a population of 313 people.

In the  River Ranch had a population of 357 people.

Attractions
The Calliope River Historical Village is located on the Old Bruce Highway (adjacent to the current Bruce Highway) where it crosses the Calliope River.

References

Gladstone Region
Localities in Queensland